Jamie Watson may refer to:

Jamie Watson (basketball) (born 1972), American basketball player
Jamie Watson (soccer) (born 1986), American soccer player
Jamie Watson, record producer of Enter the Vaselines

See also
James Watson (disambiguation)
Jim Watson (disambiguation)